Hushed and Grim is the eighth studio album by American heavy metal band Mastodon. It was released as a double album on October 29, 2021, through  Reprise Records. The album is the band's longest to date, their first double album. Guest appearances include Soundgarden's Kim Thayil on "Had It All" and Troy Sanders' mother Jody Sanders on French horn but no guest vocal appearance by Scott Kelly from Neurosis for the first time since their 2002 debut Remission, due to Kelly's withdrawal from the public eye that was not announced until August 2022. The album also serves as a tribute to Mastodon's former manager Nick John, after his death from cancer in 2018.

Critical reception

Hushed and Grim was well received, with review aggregator Metacritic indicating "universal acclaim" with a score of 82/100 based on 13 reviews. AllMusic critic Thom Jurek wrote that the album's tracks are "rendered with abundant creativity, massive power, and searing honesty." Rolling Stone commented that "Hushed and Grim never stops giving, and the album’s energy, depth, and power make it a completely unique addition to the band’s mammoth catalog." In an outlying review, however, Chris O'Connell of Pitchfork called the album "an inoffensive, occasionally alluring, but overwhelmingly dull 90-minute slog."

Accolades

Track listing

Personnel

Mastodon
 Brann Dailor – drums, vocals (except 2, 10, 11)
 Brent Hinds – lead guitar, vocals (5, 9)
 Bill Kelliher – rhythm guitar
 Troy Sanders – vocals, bass guitar

Additional musicians
 João Nogueira – keyboards
 Darby Rose Tapley – intro vocals (3)
 Marcus King – solo guitar (5)
 Dave Witte – percussion (10)
 Rich Doucette - sarangi (10)
 Jody Sanders – French horn (11)
 Kim Thayil – solo guitar (11)
 Kevin Fox – cello, string arrangement (15)
 Drew Jurecka – viola, violin (15)

Technical
 David Bottrill – production, mixing
 Ted Jensen – mastering
 Ryan McCambridge – engineering
 Tom Tapley – recording
 Billy Joe Bowers – editing
 Miles Landrum – recording assistance
 Braden Griffith – additional engineering (5)
 Nathan Yaccino – additional engineering (11)

Artwork
Album artwork by Paul Romano, who has illustrated all covers for previous Mastodon releases except The Hunter and Once More 'Round the Sun. The cover features the title plaque before a dormant tree resembling a torso and outstretched arms, rendered in blacks and greys. The face of Nick John, the bands longtime manager, appears within the tree, peering above an Dharmachakra or 8-spoked wheel. The band attributes John's passing in 2018 as the thematic lyrical inspiration for the album. Also pictured are a stag, bunny with a crow mask, spider, and several hyenas, one of which faces the viewer sporting a Thalia and Melpomene-like saddle on its back, giving an appearance of Cerberus. The cover artwork is the central of five main square panels which combine to form a cross containing the tree, its branches, and roots. Four additional panels form the corners with ancillary themes. The tree is surmounted in the top panel by a hawk with an open exposed heart and rose wreath. Scales seen below the tree on the cover panel develop to a python descending into a cavern containing lascivious scenes supervised by a bull-horned, winged being in the bottom panel. The left branch shows wintering wolves set before Byzantine architecture; at right, The Hanged Man hangs from the branch aside the Emperor of Sand beneath a Spring storm.

Charts

Year-end charts

References

Mastodon (band) albums
2021 albums